Heubach is a town in Baden-Württemberg, Germany.

Heubach may also refer to:

Heubach (Emmer), river of North Rhine-Westphalia, Germany, tributary of the Emmer
Heubach (Halterner Mühlenbach), river of North Rhine-Westphalia, Germany, upstream of the Halterner Mühlenbach
Heubach (Kinzig), river of Baden-Württemberg, Germany, tributary of the Kinzig
Heubach (Main), river of Bavaria, Germany, tributary of the Main
Ernst Heubach, a company of Thuringia that manufactured porcelain-headed bisque dolls

People with the surname
Jeroen Heubach (born 1974), Dutch footballer
Silvia Heubach, German-American mathematician
Tim Heubach (born 1988), German footballer